Dot is a given name, often a short form (hypocorism) of the female name Dorothy, and a nickname. Notable people and characters with the name include:

Women
 Dot Allison (born 1969), Scottish singer and songwriter
 Dot Bailey (1916–2009), New Zealand cricketer
 Dot Farley (1881–1971), American film actress
 Dot Germain (born 1947), American LPGA golfer
 Dot Laughton (1913–1982), Australian cricketer
 Dot Lemon (1907–1986), early American aviator and barnstormer
 Dot Moore (1914–2007), American television personality
 Dot Richardson (born 1961), American physician, softball coach and former player
 Dot Wilkinson (born 1921), American former softball player and bowler, member of the Halls of Fame of both sports

Men
 Dot Fulghum (1900–1947), American Major League Baseball player in the 1921 season

Fictional characters
 Dot, the title character of Dot and the Kangaroo, an 1899 children's book by Ethel C. Pedley and derivative works
 Dot, the title character of Dot and Tot of Merryland, a 1901 novel by L. Frank Baum
 Dot, a character in the 1998 Disney-Pixar 3D computer-animated film A Bug's Life
 Dot, a character in the Stephen Sondheim musical Sunday in the Park with George
 Dot, a character in the massively multiplayer online game Club Penguin
 Dot, a Simon Kidgits character developed by Simon Brand Ventures
 Dot, the titular protagonist of the animated preschool television series Dot.
 Little Dot, a comic book character
 Dot and Dash, the mascots of PBS Kids
 Dot Branning, also known as Dot Cotton, a character in the British soap opera EastEnders
 Dot Cottan, a character in the BBC police procedural drama Line of Duty
Dot Starlight, one of the first eight Lalaloopsy dolls released.
 Dot Matrix, a character in the Canadian animated television series ReBoot
 Dot Pixis, a character in the anime series Attack on Titan
 Dot Warner, a character in the 1990s animated television series Animaniacs

See also
 Dots Miller (1886–1923), American Major League Baseball player
 Dottie, another given name

Feminine given names
Hypocorisms